is a Japanese monthly women's magazine with a special focus on fashion. The magazine is based in Tokyo, Japan. Founded in 1936, it is the first fashion magazine in the country. It is also the oldest Japanese fashion magazine still in publication.

History and profile
Soen was established by Bunka Fukusō Gakuin (meaning Bunka Fashion College in English) in 1936. The magazine is published by Bunka Publishing Bureau on a monthly basis. It has a sister publication, High Fashion. Soen targets women.

In the 1950s Soen featured articles on Paris fashion week. In addition, the magazine also covered new look style of Dior between 1948 and 1950. It awards the Soen Prize, which was formed in 1956. Some of the Japanese fashion designers won the prize include Junko Koshino, Yohji Yamamoto, Kenzo Takada, Kansai Yamamoto, Tokio Kumagai, Kensho Abe, and Yusuke Takahashi.

References

External links
 Official website

1936 establishments in Japan
Fashion magazines published in Japan
Magazines established in 1936
Magazines published in Tokyo
Monthly magazines published in Japan
Women's fashion magazines
Women's magazines published in Japan